AUN or Aun may refer to:

 Aun, a mythical Swedish king
 Aun (surname), an Estonian-language surname
 ASEAN University Network, an Asian university association
 Auburn Municipal Airport (California) (FAA LID code: AUN), a public airport in California
 A-un, the Japanese transliteration of the word "om"

See also 
 Avun, a village in Azerbaijan